Social Security Scotland (Scottish Gaelic: Tèarainteachd Shòisealta Alba) is an executive agency of the Scottish Government with responsibility for social security provision.

History

The devolved Scottish Parliament was established in 1999 with legislative authority over many areas of social policy. However, social security remained a reserved matter of the UK Government through the Department for Work and Pensions.  The Smith Commission following the ‘No’ vote to independence in the 2014 referendum recommended that authority over several areas of social security be transferred to the Scottish Parliament under a revised devolution settlement for Scotland.

This was put into statue through the Scotland Act 2016.

Legislation

With the Scotland Act 2016 transferring authority over some elements of social security, the Scottish Government introduced the Social Security (Scotland) Bill.  This Bill introduced a different approach to administering social security in Scotland compared to the approach of the United Kingdom.  The Bill set out 8 principles of social security, putting into statute that social security is a human right, it is to be delivered as a public service and that it is to contribute to the reducing of poverty and provide dignity and respect to Scottish citizens.

The Bill sets out the need for a Scottish social security charter, which sets out the expectations of Scottish Ministers when developing social security policy, the expectations of Social Security Scotland when administering policies, and the expectations on individuals who are receiving assistance from Social Security Scotland.

The Bill established the Scottish Commission on Social Security, which is a corporate body independent of the Scottish Government.  The Commission's purpose is to scrutinise Scottish Government policy decisions and to ensure that the Scottish Government and Social Security Scotland are fulfilling the legal requirements under the Bill.

This Bill was passed on 25 April 2018 and received Royal Assent on 1 June 2018 as the Social Security (Scotland) Act 2018. It is the first Scotland wide social security agency in the nation's history.

Ministers

From May 2021, the Cabinet Secretary of the Scottish Government with responsibility for Social Security Scotland is the Cabinet Secretary for Social Justice, Housing and Local Government, supported by the Minister for Social Security and Local Government. Previously, from June 2018 to May 2021, responsibility sat with the Cabinet Secretary for Social Security and Older People, supported by the Minister for Equalities and Older People.

Benefits

Disability Payments
The Scottish Government is taking over disability benefits that are currently delivered by the UK Government. Due to the COVID-19 pandemic, the Scottish Government delayed the launch of disability benefits.

In July 2021, Child Disability Payment launched as a pilot in Dundee City, Perth and Kinross, and the Western Isles, replacing Disability Living Allowance for children. In November 2021, Child Disability Payment was rolled out to the rest of Scotland. Child Disability Payment provides support for the extra costs that a disabled child might have and can be paid up until a child turns 18 years old. The payment has a care component and a mobility component, each with three different payment rates.

In March 2022, Adult Disability Payment launched as a pilot in Dundee City, Perth and Kinross, and the Western Isles, replacing Personal Independence Payment. Adult Disability Payment is available in these areas for people between 16 years old and state pension age, who are disabled, have a long-term health condition, or a terminal illness. People with ongoing awards of Personal Independence Payment do not need to make an application as their awards will automatically transfer to Social Security Scotland, with first awards transferring in summer 2022. Further Council areas were introduced in phases. Adult Disability Payment launched nationally on 29 August 2022.

The Scottish Government will also replace Attendance Allowance with the new Pension Age Disability Payment.

Scottish Child Payment
Scottish Child Payment is a new payment announced by the Scottish Government in mid-2019 as a means to help reduce the prevalence of childhood poverty in Scotland. 

The payment was first introduced for eligible families with children under six, with applications open from November 2020 and first payments being made in February 2021. Initially the payment was £10 per week, per child, however this was doubled to £20 in April 2021.

On 14 November 2022, Scottish Child Payment rolled out to families with children under 16 years old and the payment increased for a third time to £25 per week, per child. The payment is limited to families with age-eligible children on low-incomes and in receipt of certain means tested benefits such as income-based Jobseekers Allowance or ESA (disability), Universal Credit, and certain legacy benefits.

Best Start Grant
Best Start Grant replaces the Sure Start Maternity Grant and is made up of three payments: Pregnancy and Baby Payment, Early Learning Payment, and School Age Payment. Best Start Foods is also under the Best Start Grant umbrella. The benefits are aimed at providing parents or carers who receive certain benefits or tax credits with extra financial support during key stages of a child's life.

Funeral Support Payment
Funeral Support Payment replaces the Funeral Payment and aims to reduce funeral poverty in Scotland by providing people who receive certain benefits or tax credits with a payment that can be used to help pay funeral costs, burial or cremation costs, travel costs, and medical costs.

Carer’s Allowance Supplement
An extra payment to carers in Scotland who are receiving a full or partial Carer's Allowance payment from the Department for Work and Pensions. Social Security Scotland pays this automatically every six months, in June and December, without the need for applications. This payment will run until Scottish Government plans for a new Carer's Allowance are in place. Each six monthly payment will be uprated annually with inflation. From April 2022, Carer's Allowance Supplement will increase to £245.70 for each payment.

In June 2020, an extra Carer's Allowance Supplement payment of £230.10 was paid alongside the standard payment. This was a one-off payment to provide support to carers during the COVID-19 pandemic.

Young Carer Grant
Young Carer Grant is a new grant for young carers, aged 16 to 18 years old, who care for someone for at least 16 hours a week but do not qualify for Carer's Allowance. The grant provides a payment of more than £300 every year to young carers up until the age of 19. Young Carer Grant increases in line with inflation and currently is a yearly payment of £326.65.

Job Start Payment
Job Start Payment is a new benefit to help young people with the costs of the transition into employment, after a period of time out of paid work. The benefit is a payment of £267.65, or £428.25 if the person has a child, and is available for young people aged 16 to 24 (up to 25 years old if a care leaver). Initially scheduled to launch in March 2020, the payment was delayed due to the COVID-19 pandemic. Job Start Payment was launched in August 2020.

Child Winter Heating Assistance
Child Winter Heating Assistance is a new payment to help with winter costs for families with children in receipt Child Disability Payment or the highest rate of the care component of Disability Living Allowance for children. Child Winter Heating Assistance was the first disability benefit delivered by Social Security Scotland. The payment launched in winter 2020, with families being paid in December 2020. The payment is £214.10 per eligible child, and is paid automatically to eligible families without needing to apply.

Locations

Social Security Scotland operates from the headquarters Agnes Husband House in Dundee and a large office on High Street, Glasgow. The Agency also has local level operations across each local authority in Scotland for face-to-face provision.

Budget

In 2019–20, the Scottish Government budget for Social Security policy totalled at over £434 million.

Social Security reserved to the United Kingdom

With the Scotland Act 2016 only devolving some aspects of social security provisions, many services remain reserved to the UK Government, administered through the Department for Work and Pensions based on UK Government policy decisions. These include:

 Universal Credit 
 Jobseeker's Allowance
 Employment and Support Allowance
 Income Support
 Working Tax Credit
 Child Tax Credit
 Housing Benefit
 Child Benefit
 Severe Disablement Allowance
 Maternity Allowance
 Guardian's Allowance
 State Pension
 Pension Credit
 Incapacity Benefit
 Vaccine Damage Payment
 Widowed Parent's Allowance
 Support for Mortgage Interest
 Statutory Payments
 Bereavement Allowance
 Bereavement Payment
 Widowed Payment Allowance
 Carer's Credit
 Armed Forces Independence Payment
 Parents Learning Allowance
 Blind Person's Allowance
 National Concessionary Fuel Scheme
 Warm Home Discount Scheme 
 War Widower Pension
 Mortgage Interest Run On
 Diffuse Mesothelioma Payment
 Disability Premiums

References

Executive agencies of the Scottish Government
2018 establishments in Scotland
Social security in the United Kingdom
Government agencies established in 2018